Lee Everett Blair (October 1, 1911 – April 19, 1993) was an American artist. He was born in Los Angeles, California and died in Soquel, California. He was the younger brother of Preston Blair and the husband of Mary Blair.

In 1932 he won a gold medal in the art competitions of the Olympic Games for his "Rodeo".

References

External links
 profile

1911 births
1993 deaths
Artists from California
Olympic gold medalists in art competitions
Medalists at the 1932 Summer Olympics
People from Soquel, California
Olympic competitors in art competitions